The 1904 Dallas mayoral election was a mayoral election in Dallas, Texas, held alongside municipal elections. The election was held on April 5, 1905. In this election Bryan T. Barry won against an unknown candidate.

References 

Mayoral elections in Dallas